Shivaji Lotan Patil is an Indian film director. He received the 60th National Award for Best Director for his Marathi film Dhag.

His film 31st October received positive feedback at its screening at the July 2015 London Indian Film Festival. Shivaji Lotan Patil directed Marathi film Halal (film) produced by Amol Kagne.

His next Marathi movies (Loud speaker ) shooting is just started in his hometown as earlier he done three movies in his town place . Dhag, Halal, and one not realise yet and the upcoming fourth is loud speaker.

Filmography

References

External links

 
 
 

Marathi film directors
Best Director National Film Award winners
Living people
21st-century Indian film directors
1970 births